The Jennifer Diamond Cancer Foundation is a 501(c)(3) nonprofit organization which raises money to help people with cancer, and survivors of cancer, as well as their families. Its headquarters are located in Chatsworth, California.

History 
Established in 2002, the foundation was named after Jennifer Diamond who died from a rare form of cancer, appendiceal carcinoma, at age 30.

The foundation raised money to help create cancer information libraries, in cancer centers and hospitals throughout California, with space donated by each institution. Between 2007 and 2013, eight cancer information libraries have been opened across Central and Southern California, including at USC Norris Comprehensive Cancer Center and Providence Saint Joseph Medical Center.

In October 2012, Los Angeles City Councilman Mitchell Englander presented the foundation with a commendation, in recognition of its programs and services.

As of 2013, the foundation began providing free cancer support programs.

References

Notes

External links

Cancer charities in the United States
Chatsworth, Los Angeles
Charities based in California
Medical and health organizations based in California